The Interdisciplinary Contest in Modeling is a multi-day mathematics competition held annually by COMAP and sponsored by SIAM, the NSA, and INFORMS.  It is distinguished from other major mathematical competitions such as Putnam by its strong focus on research, originality, teamwork, communication and justification of results.

Around 1500 international teams of three undergraduates compete to produce original mathematical papers in response to an interdisciplinary modeling problem. Once the problem is posted, teams are given 96 hours (usually Thursday to Monday) to research and submit solutions.

See also 
 Mathematical Contest in Modeling

External links 
 Official contest website 

Mathematics competitions